Second album of Polish hardcore punk rock band Eye for an Eye

Track listing

"Otwórz drzwi" – 1:13
"Warriors" – 2:08
"Krzyczymy" – 1:39
"Klatka" – 2:06
"Konflikt" – 1:53
"W tłumie" – 1:53
"Śmiech" – 1:37
"Dżuma" – 1:43
"Why not?" – 2:15
"Dojrzałość" – 1:16
"Silikonowy świat" – 1:54
"W igle" – 2:18
"Kryminał" – 1:41
"Budzik" – 2:15

Personnel

Anka - vocals
Tomek - guitar, vocals
Bartek - guitar, vocals
Damian - bass guitar, vocals
Rafał - drums

Resources
Band's official site

2004 albums
Eye for an Eye (band) albums